Hearts Are Trumps may refer to:
Hearts Are Trumps (1920 American film), a silent drama by Rex Ingram 
Hearts Are Trumps (1920 German film), a silent film by E. A. Dupont
Hearts Are Trumps (1934 film), a German comedy by Carl Boese

See also
Darts Are Trumps, a 1938 British comedy film by Maclean Rogers 
Hearts Are Thumps, a 1937 Our Gang short